This article is about the particular significance of the year 1925 to Wales and its people.

Incumbents

Archbishop of Wales – Alfred George Edwards, Bishop of St Asaph
Archdruid of the National Eisteddfod of Wales – Elfed

Events
3 February - An estimated 100,000 people line the streets of Cardiff for the funeral of 'peerless' Jim Driscoll.
13 July - The Ammanford anthracite strike begins.
5 August - Founding of Plaid Cymru by Lewis Valentine (head of Y Mudiad Cymreig - ), H. R. Jones (head of the  - ), and others at Pwllheli. 
2 November - After several days of heavy rain, the Llyn Eigiau dam at Dolgarrog on the River Conwy bursts, destroying the village of Porth-llwyd and killing 16 people.
date unknown
Clough Williams-Ellis begins construction of Portmeirion.
US newspaper magnate William Randolph Hearst buys the medieval St Donat's Castle in the Vale of Glamorgan for $120,000.
R. Silyn Roberts founds the North Wales branch of the Workers Educational Association.

Arts and literature

Awards

National Eisteddfod of Wales (held in Pwllheli)
National Eisteddfod of Wales: Chair - Dewi Morgan (Dewi Teifi), "Cantre'r Gwaelod"
National Eisteddfod of Wales: Crown - William Evans (Wil Ifan), "Bro Fy Mebyd"

New books

English language
Sir Joseph Alfred Bradney - A Survey of the General History of the Town of Newport and District
Ifano Jones - Printing and Printers in Wales
Hilda Vaughan - The Battle to the Weak
Mortimer Wheeler - Prehistoric & Roman Wales

Welsh language
David Rees Davies - Tusw o Flodau
Edward Tegla Davies - Rhys Llwyd Y Lleuad
Thomas Davies (Teglyn) - Dinas Mawddwy a'i Hamgylchoedd
Henry Lewis (ed.) - Cywyddau Iolo Goch ac Eraill
William David Owen - Madam Wen.
Kate Roberts (author) - O gors y bryniau (short stories)
R. Silyn Roberts - Bugail Geifr Lorraine

Music
Mai Jones - "Blackbirds"

Film
27 July - The first Welsh-made animation series, Jerry the Tyke, is shown through Pathé Pictorials in British cinemas.
Gareth Hughes appears in The Midnight Girl.
Ivor Novello appears in The Rat.

Broadcasting
14 February - The BBC transmits readings from the poetry of T. Gwynn Jones.
22 February - A Welsh-language religious service is broadcast by the BBC.
28 February - Saunders Lewis insists on using the Welsh language for his contribution to the BBC series A Welsh Hour.
6 March - Readings from the poetry of R. Williams Parry are broadcast by the BBC.
3 April - The BBC's Liverpool transmitter broadcasts Noson Gymreig (A Welsh Night).
31 May - A bilingual service is broadcast from Cardiff Baptist Chapel.
2 October - The BBC broadcasts a talk on the Welsh language from Swansea.

Sport
Boxing
26 December - Tom Norris beats Dick Power at the Palace Theatre in Crumlin to take the Welsh heavyweight championship.
Football:
28 February - England defeat Wales 2–1 at the Vetch Field, Swansea.
25 April - Cardiff City reach the FA Cup final, losing 1–0 to Sheffield United
31 October - Scotland defeat Wales 3–0 at Ninian Park.
The Welsh Lawn Tennis Association is formed.
Rugby union - Wales finish fourth in the Five Nations Championship with just one win, over France.

Births
26 March - Emlyn Hooson, Baron Hooson, lawyer and Liberal politician (died 2012)
15 April - Geraint Howells, Liberal politician (died 2004)
2 May - Dai Davies, Wales and British Lions international rugby union player (died 2003)
1 June - Roy Clarke, footballer (died 2006)
10 June - Sir John Stradling Thomas, Conservative politician (died 1991)
19 July - Ivor Roberts, television announcer and actor (died 1999)
30 July - Don Hayward, Wales international rugby player (died 1999 in New Zealand)
7 September - Laura Ashley, designer (died 1985)
10 October - Tecwyn Roberts, spaceflight engineer (died 1988 in the United States)
3 November - Gordon Parry, Baron Parry, Welsh politician (died 2004)
10 November - Richard Burton, born Richard Jenkins, actor (died 1984)
24 November - Alun Owen, screenwriter (died 1994)
27 November - John Maddox, science writer (died 2009)
3 December - Roy John, Wales and British Lions international rugby union player (died 1981)
14 December - Ron Stitfall, footballer (died 2008)

Deaths
21 January - John Puleston Jones (in Welsh), Methodist minister and author, 62
27 January - Francis Grenfell, 1st Baron Grenfell, 83
30 January - Jim Driscoll, boxer ("Peerless Jim"), 44
4 February - William Haggar, pioneer of the cinema industry, 73
18 February - Frank Mills, Wales international rugby player
8 June - Edward John Lewis, Wales international rugby union player, 65
9 August - J. Vyrnwy Morgan, minister and author, 65
25 August - John Fox Tallis, mining engineer, 70
26 September - William Bowen, rugby player, 63
19 October - David John Thomas, Wales international rugby union, 45
4 November - William David Owen, writer, 51
16 November - Towyn Jones, politician, 66
20 November - Alexandra of Denmark, the queen mother, former Princess of Wales, 80
19 December - Elizabeth Phillips Hughes, teacher, 74

See also
 1925 in Northern Ireland

References

 
Wales